Municipal elections were held in Quebec City on November 7, 2021, the same day as elections in Montreal and other municipalities in the province.

Background 
The election took place as Quebec, Canada and the world continued to manage the COVID-19 pandemic in Quebec. Outgoing mayor Régis Labeaume, announced he was not running for another term, making it the first time since 2007 that a new mayor was to be elected in the city.

Candidates 
The primary candidates included Jackie Smith (leader of Transition Québec), Marie-Josée Savard (who had the support of Labeaume), Jean-François Gosselin former Action démocratique du Québec MNA and leader of Québec 21, Jean Rousseau, leader of Démocratie Québec and Bruno Marchand, former director of the United Way of Canada in the Capitale-Nationale, Chaudière-Appalaches and Bas-Saint-Laurent regions.

Political parties

Québec 21 

 Slogan : Pour un vote historique / Pour participer au changement

Démocratie Québec 

 Slogan : Ensemble, c'est mieux (English: Better together)

A year before the election, on October 3, 2020, Jean Rousseau, the party's only member on the City Council, was named the party's leader by acclamation.

Transition Québec 

 Slogan : Changeons de cap
The party Option Capitale-Nationale appeared in previous municipal elections as the municipal wing of Option nationale, a progressive sovereigntist party. Following Option Nationale's merger with Québec Solidaire, Option Capitale-Nationale changed its name to "Transition Québec" in May 2020. Like its provincial counterparts, Transition Québec focuses on issues of environmental sustainability, Left-wing solidarity, and feminism. Since June 19, 2019, the party has been led by Jacquelyn Smith, who ran in the previous election in the Limoilou district as a member of Démocratie Québec.

Québec Forte et Fière 

 Slogan : Pour une ville forte et fière (English: For a city strong and proud)

On February 15, 2021, a new political party joined the election. Bruno Marchand, former director of the United Way of Canada in the Capitale-Nationale, Chaudière-Appalaches and Bas-Saint-Laurent regions, was named as party leader. The party supported Quebec City Tramway project of Mayor Labeaume's administration, but withheld judgement on a possible third line between Québec City and Lévis until it was officially announced by the government. Portraying themselves as centrist, the party hopes to establish "positive and benevolent leadership".

Results

Mayor

City Council Districts

La Cité-Limoilou

Les Rivières

Sainte-Foy–Sillery–Cap-Rouge

Charlesbourg

Beauport

La Haute-Saint-Charles

Polls

See also 
 Quebec City Council

References 

Quebec City
Municipal elections in Quebec City